Clare Waight Keller (born 19 August 1970) is a British stylist and fashion designer, who has served as the Artistic Director for a number of luxury fashion houses and brands, including Pringle of Scotland, Chloé, and Givenchy.

Early life
Keller was born in Birmingham, England on 19 August 1970. She studied at Ravensbourne College of Art, where she graduated with a bachelor's degree in Fashion, followed by a master's degree at the Royal College of Art.

Career 
She started her career at Calvin Klein in New York as a stylist for the women's ready-to-wear line, then at Ralph Lauren, for the Purple Label menswear line. In 2000, she was hired by Tom Ford to join Gucci, responsible for women's ready-to-wear and accessories, until her departure in 2004. The following year, she became Artistic Director of Pringle of Scotland. In 2007, she received the Scottish Fashion Awards 'Designer of the Year' in the cashmere category. She resigned her position at Pringle of Scotland in 2011. In the same year, she moved to Paris where she became the Artistic Director of Chloé. In 2017, Keller was appointed Artistic Director of haute couture and ready-to-wear for women and men at Givenchy. Replacing Riccardo Tisci, she was the first woman to hold the position at the company.

She designed the wedding dress which Meghan Markle wore for her wedding to Prince Harry, Duke of Sussex, on 19 May 2018.

For her second couture show, Waight Keller went through Givenchy's archives, and used modern materials "to create something that floats".

In January 2019, for autumn/winter 19, Waight Keller presented her first standalone menswear collection for Givenchy in Paris. It was an intimate salon show that just consisted of 17 looks with a complete day to evening wardrobe. While future Givenchy ready-to-wear and haute couture shows will remain combined, this means Waight Keller's vision of Givenchy menswear is given its own stage.

She left Givenchy on 10 April 2020.

Awards and honours 
At the 2018 British Fashion Awards, Keller was presented the British Designer of the Year Womenswear Award by Meghan, Duchess of Sussex and actress Rosamund Pike.

In 2019, Time magazine included Keller in its annual list of the most influential people of the year.

Personal life
She is married to Philip Keller, an architect. They have three children, twins Amelia and Charlotte, and Harrison.

References

1970 births
Living people
20th-century English women artists
21st-century English women artists
Alumni of the Royal College of Art
Artists from Birmingham, West Midlands
British women fashion designers
English fashion designers
Wedding dress designers